Simo Akrenius (born 22 July 1949) is a Finnish judoka. He competed in the men's middleweight event at the 1972 Summer Olympics.

References

1949 births
Living people
Finnish male judoka
Olympic judoka of Finland
Judoka at the 1972 Summer Olympics
Sportspeople from Helsinki